Juxtlahuaca District is located in the southwest of the Mixteca Region of the State of Oaxaca, Mexico. The largest town is Santiago Juxtlahuaca.
The district is at an average elevation of 1,690 meters above sea level, and has an area of 1,848 km2.
It is divided into seven municipalities, and as of 2005 had 281 settlements with a total population of 72,176.

History

Juxtlahuaca district was created by decree on 14 October 1868.
It was briefly merged into the Silacayoapan district in January 1872, then restored in December 1872.
In December 1906 the district was merged into the Tlaxiaco district, but on 23 January 1932 the district was finally restored.

Climate and economy

The climate is temperate, with average temperature of 21°C. Rainfall is variable, mainly between June and September, and ranging fr4om 600mm to 2,200mm.
The land is forested with trees that include pine, fir, oak, alder, fig, avocado, mahogany and cedar.
Fauna include squirrel, opossum, rabbit, mountain lion, coyote, fox, gray owl, owl bells, wild cat, rat, civet, tree frog and rattlesnake.

Principal occupations as of 2000 were Agriculture, hunting and fishing 54%, Mining, petroleum, manufacturing, construction and electricity 16% and Trade, tourism and services 26%.
Agricultural products include maize and beans, as well as coffee, sugarcane and fruits.
Animal husbandry includes the care and breeding of cattle, goats, horses, sheep and poultry.

Municipalities

The district includes the following municipalities:

See also
Municipalities of Oaxaca

References

Districts of Oaxaca
Mixteca Region